The Blues, the Whole Blues, and Nothing But the Blues is an album by the David Bromberg Band.  It was released by Red House Records on October 14, 2016.

The album contains thirteen blues songs – eleven covers and two originals – performed in a wide variety of styles. David Bromberg sings and plays electric and acoustic guitar.  He is accompanied by Mark Cosgrove (electric guitar, mandolin), Nate Grower (fiddle), Butch Amiot (bass guitar), and Josh Kanusky (drums).  Some of the tracks also feature various guest musicians, including Bill Payne on keyboards, Lou Marini on saxophone, Steve Bernstein on trumpet, Birch Johnson on trombone, and Larry Campbell, who served as the album's producer, on acoustic guitar.

Critical reception
In PopMatters, Ed Whitelock wrote, "The album is a master-class in blues-oriented Americana as Bromberg and his accompanists bring to life a collection of 11 smartly chosen covers and two Bromberg originals that fit seamlessly into the flow.... The precision of the players and the interplay of instruments gives them the freedom to move from the country blues of the Mississippi Delta to the jug band tradition of the urban South, and from New Orleans to Chicago, embracing the breadth of American music in its myriad places and times."

In Glide magazine, Lee Zimmerman said, "David Bromberg’s fondness for the blues has been a single-minded concern throughout his storied career, one that’s found him working alongside any number of icons, folks like Bob Dylan and George Harrison included....  Of course, it’s Bromberg’s fretwork, the chief reason he’s racked up his reputation, that takes center stage. He’s not always a flashy player, but relies instead on a tasteful tack that ensures his distinction."

The Associated Press wrote, "Bromberg has never sung better, his wise, warm warble enhanced by masterful timing and droll wit. His guitar still gets its licks in, too... Arrangements are tight and the mood is loose as the group covers material by Robert Johnson, Bessie Smith and Sonny Boy Williamson, among others. The liner notes include useful cut-by-cut commentary from Bromberg, who explains what Johnson meant referring to an ex-mate's "Elgin movements" in "Walkin' Blues"."

In Blues Blast magazine, Steve Jones said, "David Bromberg has had a fifty-five year recording career and his music still sounds fresh and new.... This is a super CD by a great and talented set of artists.  The fun they had making it really comes out in their music – it is a joy to listen to!"

Track listing
"Walkin' Blues" (Robert Johnson) – 5:39
"How Come My Dog Don't Bark When You Come 'Round?" (unknown) – 4:26
"Kentucky Blues" (George "Little Hat" Jones) – 2:29
"Why Are People Like That?" (Bobby Charles) – 4:02
"A Fool for You" (Ray Charles) – 4:54
"Eyesight to the Blind" (Sonny Boy Williamson) – 3:30
"500 Miles" (traditional, arranged by David Bromberg and Larry Campbell) – 4:54
"Yield Not to Temptation" (Deadric Malone) – 2:42
"You've Been a Good Ole Wagon" (John Willie Henry) – 5:51
"Delia" (traditional, arranged by Bromberg) – 6:38
"The Blues, the Whole Blues, and Nothing But the Blues" (Gary Nicholson, Russell Smith) – 3:25
"This Month" (Bromberg) – 5:53
"You Don't Have to Go" (Bromberg) – 3:19

Personnel
David Bromberg Band
David Bromberg – electric guitar, electric slide guitar, acoustic guitar, vocals
Butch Amiot – bass guitar
Mark Cosgrove – electric guitar, mandolin
Josh Kanusky – drums
Nate Grower – fiddle

Additional musicians
Marco Benevento – piano
Steve Bernstein – trumpet
Larry Campbell – acoustic guitar, acoustic slide guitar
Justin Guip – tambourine
Birch Johnson – trombone
Nancy Josephson – backing vocals
Lou Marini – saxophone, clarinet
Bill Payne – piano, organ, keyboards
Kathleen Weber – backing vocals
Teresa Williams – backing vocals

Production
Larry Campbell – producer, horn arrangements
Justin Guip – recording, mixing
Greg Calbi – mastering
Peter Ecklund – horn arrangements
Jeri Heiden – art direction
Jim McGuire – photography
Delores Lowe – executive producer
Robert F. Macchione – executive producer
Mark McKenna – management
Mike Russo – tour manager
David Bromberg – liner notes essay ("The Whole Blues & Nothing But")

References

David Bromberg albums
Red House Records albums
2016 albums
albums produced by Larry Campbell (musician)